= Shinkichi =

- Gender: Male

Origin
- Origin: Japanese
- Meaning: Different meanings depending on the kanji used

Japanese poet

- Shinkichi Kezuka (毛塚 真吉; born 1998), Japanese rugby Player
